Soner may refer to:

 Soner Arıca (born 1966), Turkish singer and record producer
 Soner Aydoğdu (born 1991), Turkish footballer
 Soner Cagaptay (born 1970), Turkish-American political scientist
 Soner Demirtaş (born 1991), Turkish freestyle sport wrestler
 Soner Özbilen (born 1947), Turkish folk singer, conductor, and compiler
 Soner Uysal (born 1977), Turkish football coach

Turkish masculine given names